The New Orleans crime family or New Orlean Mafia was an Italian-American Mafia crime family based in the city of New Orleans. The family had a history of criminal activity dating back to the late nineteenth century. The family reached its height of influence under bosses Silvestro Carollo and Carlos Marcello. In the 1960s, due to Marcello’s stubborn refusal of inducting new members into the family, they dwindled down to a paltry four or five made men with hundreds of associates throughout the United States. However, the Federal Bureau of Investigation believed there were a bit over 20 made men at the time, or 20+ associates so close to Marcello and to each other, that they were considered a formal part of the New Orleans’ family hierarchy. A series of setbacks during the 1980s reduced its clout, and law enforcement dismantled most of what remained shortly after Marcello's death in 1993. In spite of this, it is believed that at least some elements of the American Mafia remain active in New Orleans today.

History

Early history
The Matranga crime family, established by Charles (1857 - October 28, 1943) and Antonio (Tony) Matranga  (d. 1890 ?), was one of the earliest recorded American Mafia crime families, operating in New Orleans during the late 19th century until the beginning of Prohibition in 1920.

Born of Arbëreshê descent and members of the Italo-Albanian Greek Catholic Church in Piana dei Greci, Sicily, Carlo and Antonio Matranga immigrated to New Orleans during the 1870s and eventually opened a saloon and brothel. Using their business as a base of operations, the Matranga brothers began establishing lucrative organized criminal activities including extortion and labor racketeering. Receiving tribute payments from Italian laborers and dockworkers, as well as from the Provenzano family (who came from the same village), they eventually began moving in on Provenzano fruit loading operations intimidating the Provenzanos with threats of violence.

Although the Provenzanos withdrew in favor of giving the Matrangas a cut of waterfront racketeering, by the late 1880s, the two families eventually went to war over the grocery and produce businesses held by the Provenzanos. As both sides began employing a large number of Sicilian mafiosi from their native Monreale, Sicily, the violent gang war began attracting police attention, particularly from New Orleans police chief David Hennessy who began investigating the warring organizations. Within months of his investigation, Hennessy was shot by several unidentified attackers while walking home on the night of October 15, 1890; he died of his wounds less than twelve hours later, having failed to identify his assailants beyond allegedly claiming "The Dagoes shot me". The shooter was never positively identified and the assassination remains unsolved.

The murder of Hennessey created a huge backlash from the city and, although Charles and several members of the Matrangas were arrested, they were eventually tried and acquitted in February 1891 with Charles Matranga and a 14-year-old member acquitted midway through the trial as well as four more who were eventually acquitted and three others released in hung juries. The decision caused strong protests from residents, angered by the controversy surrounding the case (particularly in the face of incriminating evidence and jury tampering), and the following month a lynch mob stormed the jail killing 11 of the 19 defendants—five of whom had not been tried—on March 14, 1891. Since then, it has been a hard and fast rule in the American Mafia that law enforcement and prosecutors are not to be harmed. While it was common for gangsters to kill officials who got in their way, the Hennessey murder convinced American gangsters that it was not worth the backlash.

Matranga was able to escape from the vigilante lynchings and, upon returning to New Orleans, resumed his position as head of the New Orleans crime family eventually forcing the declining Provenzanos out of New Orleans by the end of the decade. Matranga would rule over the New Orleans underworld until shortly after Prohibition when he turned over leadership over to Sylvestro "Sam" Carollo in the early 1920s.

Silver Dollar Sam

"Silver Dollar Sam" Carollo led the New Orleans crime family transforming predecessor Charles Matranga's Black Hand gang into a modern organized crime group.

Born in Sicily, Carollo immigrated to the United States with his parents in 1904. By 1918, Carollo had become a high-ranking member of Matranga's organization, eventually succeeding him following Matranga's retirement in 1922. Assuming control of Matranga's minor bootlegging operations, Carollo waged war against rival bootlegging gangs, gaining full control following the murder of William Bailey in December 1930.

Gaining considerable political influence within New Orleans, Carollo is said to have used his connections when, in 1929, Al Capone supposedly traveled to the city demanding Carollo supply the Chicago Outfit (rather than Chicago's Sicilian Mafia boss Joe Aiello) with imported alcohol. Meeting Capone as he arrived at a New Orleans train station, Carollo, accompanied by several police officers, reportedly disarmed Capone's bodyguards and broke their fingers, forcing Capone to return to Chicago.

In 1930, Carollo was arrested for the shooting of federal narcotics agent Cecil Moore, which took place during an undercover drug buy. Despite support by several New Orleans police officers who testified Carollo was in New York at the time of the murder, he was sentenced to two years.

Released in 1934, Carollo negotiated a deal with New York mobsters Frank Costello and Phillip "Dandy Phil" Kastel, as well as Louisiana Senator Huey Long, to bring slot machines into Louisiana, following New York Mayor Fiorello LaGuardia's attacks on organized crime. Carollo, with lieutenant Carlos Marcello, would run illegal gambling operations undisturbed for several years.

Carollo's legal problems continued as he was scheduled to be deported in 1940, after serving two years in Atlanta Federal Penitentiary, following his arrest on a narcotics charge in 1938. His deportation was delayed following the U.S. entry into World War II, and Carollo would continue to control the New Orleans crime family for several years before a campaign, begun by reporter Drew Pearson, exposed an attempt by Congressman Jimmy Morrison to pass a bill awarding Carollo with American citizenship (thereby making deportation illegal). Carollo would be deported in April 1947.

Soon after returning to Sicily, Carollo organized a partnership with fellow exile Charles Luciano, establishing criminal enterprises in Mexico. Briefly returning to the United States in 1949, he was deported the following year as control of the New Orleans crime family reverted to Carlos Marcello. Living in Palermo, Sicily until 1970, Carollo once again returned to the US. According to Life Magazine, he was asked to return by Marcello, who needed him to mediate disputes within the New Orleans Mafia. After a subsequent attempt to deport him failed, he died a free man in 1970.

Carlos Marcello

By the end of 1947, Carlos Marcello had taken control of Louisiana's illegal gambling network. He had also joined forces with New York Mob associate Meyer Lansky in order to skim money from some of the most important casinos in the New Orleans area shortly after becoming associated with the Hotard family through marriage. According to former members of the Chicago Outfit, Marcello was also assigned a cut of the money skimmed from Las Vegas casinos, in exchange for providing "muscle" in Florida real estate deals. By this time, Marcello had been selected as "The Godfather" of the New Orleans Mafia, by the family's capos and the National Crime Syndicate after the deportation of Sylvestro "Silver Dollar Sam" Carollo to Sicily. He held this position for the next thirty years. In a 1975 extortion trial, two witnesses described Marcello as "The Godfather" of the New Orleans crime syndicate. The New Orleans crime family frequently met at an Italian restaurant in the New Orleans suburb of Avondale, known as Mosca's, a building which Marcello had owned.

Marcello appeared before the U.S. Senate's Kefauver Committee on organized crime on January 25, 1951. He pleaded the Fifth Amendment 152 times. The Committee called Marcello "one of the worst criminals in the country".

On April 4, 1961, the U.S. Justice Department, under the direction of Attorney General Robert F. Kennedy, apprehended Marcello as he made what he assumed was a routine visit to the immigration authorities in New Orleans, then deported him to Guatemala. Two months later, he was back in New Orleans. Thereafter, he successfully fought efforts by the government to deport him.

In November 1963, Marcello was tried for "conspiracy to defraud the United States government by obtaining a false Guatemalan birth certificate" and "conspiracy to obstruct the United States government in the exercise of its right to deport Carlos Marcello". He was acquitted later that month on both charges. However, in October 1964, Marcello was charged with "conspiring to obstruct justice by fixing a juror [Rudolph Heitler] and seeking the murder of a government witness [Carl Noll]". Marcello's attorney admitted Heitler had been bribed but said that there was no evidence to connect the bribe with Marcello. Noll refused to testify against Marcello in the case. Marcello was acquitted of both charges.

In September 1966, 13 members of the New York, Louisiana and Florida crime families were arrested for "consorting with known criminals" at the La Stella Restaurant in Queens, New York. However, the charges were later dropped. Returning to New Orleans a few days later, Marcello was arrested for assaulting an FBI agent. His first trial resulted in a hung jury, but he was retried and convicted. He was sentenced to two years but served less than six months.

In its 1978 investigation of the assassination of John F. Kennedy, the House Select Committee on Assassinations said that it recognized Jack Ruby's murder of Lee Harvey Oswald as a primary reason to suspect organized crime as possibly having involvement in the assassination. In its investigation, the HSCA noted the presence of "credible associations relating both Lee Harvey Oswald and Jack Ruby to figures having a relationship, albeit tenuous, with Marcello's crime family or organization". Their report stated: "The committee found that Marcello had the motive, means and opportunity to have President John F. Kennedy assassinated, though it was unable to establish direct evidence of Marcello's complicity".

In 1981, Marcello, Aubrey W. Young (a former aide to Governor John J. McKeithen), Charles E. Roemer, II (former commissioner of administration to Governor Edwin Edwards), and two other men were indicted in the U.S. District Court for the Eastern District of Louisiana in New Orleans with conspiracy, racketeering, and mail and wire fraud in a scheme to bribe state officials to give the five men multimillion-dollar insurance contracts. The charges were the result of a Federal Bureau of Investigation probe known as BriLab. U.S. District Judge Morey Sear allowed the admission of secretly-recorded conversations that he said demonstrated corruption at the highest levels of state government. Marcello and Roemer were convicted, but Young and the two others were acquitted.

Anthony Carollo
In May 1994, following an FBI sting dubbed "Operation Hard Crust", New Orleans crime family acting boss Anthony Carollo with 16 members of the Marcello, Gambino and Genovese families were arrested on charges of infiltrating the newly legalized Louisiana video poker industry, racketeering, illegal gambling and conspiracy. In September 1995, Carollo pleaded guilty to a single count of racketeering conspiracy, with associates Frank Gagliano, Joseph Gagliano, Felix Riggio III, and Cade Carber.

Historical leadership

Boss (official and acting)
c. 1860-1869: Raffaele Agnello – murdered on April 1, 1869
1869-1872: Joseph Agnello – murdered on April 20, 1872
1872-1891: Joseph P. Macheca – lynched on March 14, 1891
1891-1922: Charles Matranga – retired, died on October 28, 1943
1922-1944: Corrado Giacona - died on July 25, 1944
1944-1947: Silvestro "Silver Dollar Sam" Carollo – deported to Italy in 1947
1947-1983: Carlos "Little Man" Marcello – imprisoned in 1983–1991
1983-1990: Joseph Marcello Jr. – stepped down due to inability to control his organization
1990-2007: Anthony Carollo – imprisoned in 1995-1998; died on February 1, 2007

Underboss
c. 1860-1869: Joseph Agnello – became boss
1869-1880: vacant/unknown
1880-1881: Vincenzo Rebello – deported to Italy in 1881.
1881-1891: Charles Matranga – became boss
1891-1896: Salvatore Matranga – died on November 18, 1896
1896-1915: Vincenzo Moreci – murdered on November 19, 1915
1915-1944: Frank Todaro - died on November 29, 1944
1944-1953: Joseph Poretto – stepped down
1953-1983: Joseph Marcello Jr. – became boss
1983-2006: Frank "Fat Frank" Gagliano Sr. – died on April 16, 2006

Consigliere
c. 1950s-1972: Vincenzo "Jimmy" Campo – died in 1972

In popular culture
The John Grisham novel and film The Client feature a fictionalized New Orleans Mafia family, which is trying to cover up its involvement in a Senator's murder.
The 1999 HBO movie Vendetta, starring Christopher Walken and directed by Nicholas Meyer, is based on the true story of the March 14, 1891, lynchings of 11 Italians in New Orleans. Charles Matranga (also spelled "Mantranga" in some documents) was one of the intended victims, but managed to survive by hiding from the mob. In the Journal of American History, historian Clive Webb calls the movie a "compelling portrait of prejudice".
The Marcano Crime Family are a fictionalized version of the New Orleans Crime Family in the 2016 video game Mafia III, which takes place in a fictional version of New Orleans called New Bordeaux, appearing as the main antagonists of the game.

References

Further reading
Steece, David. "david steece's Paradox, The True Narrative of a Real Street Man" Paradox Sales, www.davidsteece.com 2009 
Brouillette, Frenchy. Mr. New Orleans: The Life of a Big Easy Underworld Legend, Phoenix Books, 2009.
Davis, John H. Mafia Kingfish: Carlos Marcello and the Assassination of John F. Kennedy. New York: Signet, 1989. 
Fentress, James. Rebels and Mafiosi: Death in a Sicilian Landscape. New York: Cornell University Press, 2000. 
Kelly, Robert J. Encyclopedia of Organized Crime in the United States. Westport, Connecticut: Greenwood Press, 2000. 

Reppetto, Thomas. American Mafia: A History of Its Rise to Power. New York: Henry Holt & Co., 2004. 
Scott, Peter Dale and Marshall, Jonathan. Cocaine Politics: Drugs, Armies, and the CIA in Central America. Berkeley: University of California Press, 1991. 
Sifakis, Carl. The Mafia Encyclopedia. New York: Da Capo Press, 2005. 
Sifakis, Carl. The Encyclopedia of American Crime. New York: Facts on File Inc., 2001. 
Summers, Anthony. Conspiracy. New York: McGraw & Hill, 1989.
Rappleye, Charles. All American Mafiosi. New York: Doubleday, 1991.

External links
LAM: A Site Dedicated to the History of the Louisiana Mafia by Dexter Babin II
David "Blackie" Steece - The True Narrative of a Real Street Man - New Orleans Gangster Turned Law Enforcer Autobiography
Carlos Marcello: Big Daddy in the Big Easy by Thomas L. Jones
Sylvestro Carollo: Will the Real "Silver Dollar Sam" Please Stand Up by Allan May
The American "Mafia": Who Was Who ? – Charles Matranga
The American "Mafia" – New Orleans Crime Bosses

 
Organizations established in the 1860s
1860s establishments in Louisiana
Organizations disestablished in the 2000s
2000s disestablishments in Louisiana
Organizations based in New Orleans
Italian-American crime families
Gangs in New Orleans
Organized crime in Louisiana
Italian-American culture in Louisiana
History of New Orleans